Bayou Country Club is an unincorporated community and census-designated place in Lafourche Parish, Louisiana, United States. Its population was 1,396 as of the 2010 census. Louisiana Highway 1 passes through the community.

Geography

Demographics

References

Unincorporated communities in Lafourche Parish, Louisiana
Unincorporated communities in Louisiana
Census-designated places in Lafourche Parish, Louisiana
Census-designated places in Louisiana